Šenberk (also Šenberg or Šenperg) is a remote abandoned former settlement in the Municipality of Kočevje in southern Slovenia. The area is part of the traditional region of Lower Carniola and is now included in the Southeast Slovenia Statistical Region. Its territory is now part of the village of Stari Log.

History
Šenberk was a village inhabited by Gottschee Germans. It had six houses in 1931. The villagers were known for making barrels and wool coats, and for raising sheep. The village was burned by Italian troops during the Rog Offensive in the summer of 1942 and was not rebuilt after the war.

References

External links
Šenberk (Šenberg) on Geopedia
Pre–World War II list of oeconyms and family names in Šenberk

Former populated places in the Municipality of Kočevje